Diploneis is a genus of diatoms belonging to the family Diploneidaceae.

The genus has cosmopolitan distribution.

Species
According to the GBIF, there are over 400 species.

Diploneis abscondita 
Diploneis aculeata 
Diploneis adeliae 
Diploneis adiaphana 
Diploneis advena  (4)
Diploneis aequorea 
Diploneis aestica 
Diploneis aestiva  (5)
Diploneis aestuari 
Diploneis aethiopum 
Diploneis africana 
Diploneis alpina  (4)
Diploneis altana 
Diploneis amicula 
Diploneis amphisbaena 
Diploneis andama 
Diploneis andina 
Diploneis antiqua 
Diploneis aokiensis 
Diploneis apis 
Diploneis arctica 
Diploneis areolata 
Diploneis baicalensis  (15)
Diploneis baicaloculata 
Diploneis baicaloparma 
Diploneis baicalpetersenii 
Diploneis balcanica 
Diploneis barbatula 
Diploneis biremiformis 
Diploneis biseriata  (4)
Diploneis boldtiana  (7)
Diploneis bombiformis 
Diploneis bombus  (8)
Diploneis borostelekiana 
Diploneis burgitensis  (2)
Diploneis buriatica 
Diploneis caffra 
Diploneis calcilacustris 
Diploneis californica 
Diploneis cerebrum 
Diploneis chersonensis  (6)
Diploneis chersonensis 
Diploneis chinensis 
Diploneis claustra 
Diploneis clepsydra 
Diploneis clevei 
Diploneis coffaeiformis  (4)
Diploneis colae 
Diploneis conopeata 
Diploneis conops 
Diploneis constantinii 
Diploneis contraversa 
Diploneis costata 
Diploneis crassa 
Diploneis crassibiseriata 
Diploneis craticula 
Diploneis crispa 
Diploneis curiosa 
Diploneis czekehazensis 
Diploneis decipiens  (5)
Diploneis densestriata 
Diploneis densistriata 
Diploneis didelta 
Diploneis didyma 
Diploneis dilatata 
Diploneis dimorpha 
Diploneis diplosticata 
Diploneis dirhombus 
Diploneis disturbata 
Diploneis doczyi 
Diploneis dombilitensis (2)
Diploneis duplopunctata 
Diploneis elfvingiana  (2)
Diploneis elliptica  (22)
Diploneis ellipticolinearis 
Diploneis esthereia 
Diploneis excentrica 
Diploneis eximia 
Diploneis faba 
Diploneis fenestrata 
Diploneis finica (2)
Diploneis finnicoburyatica 
Diploneis fontanella 
Diploneis fontium 
Diploneis formica 
Diploneis ganga 
Diploneis gemmata 
Diploneis glabra 
Diploneis goohon 
Diploneis gorjanovici (4)
Diploneis gracilis 
Diploneis gravelleana 
Diploneis hannai 
Diploneis haploa 
Diploneis heemskerkiana 
Diploneis heisingeriae 
Diploneis heteromorphiforma 
Diploneis hinziae 
Diploneis hormopunctata 
Diploneis hospes 
Diploneis hustedtii 
Diploneis hyalina  (2)
Diploneis ideii 
Diploneis imperalis 
Diploneis implicatus 
Diploneis inaequalis 
Diploneis infernalis 
Diploneis inscripta  (2)
Diploneis insolitus 
Diploneis jasnitskii 
Diploneis kahlii 
Diploneis kawabatae 
Diploneis konstantini 
Diploneis krammeri 
Diploneis lacuslemanii  (2)
Diploneis lacustris 
Diploneis ladogensis 
Diploneis lata  (3)
Diploneis late-elliptica 
Diploneis lenzii 
Diploneis lesinensis 
Diploneis letourneuri 
Diploneis levicostata 
Diploneis lianjiangensis 
Diploneis lijingensis 
Diploneis linearielliptica 
Diploneis linearifera 
Diploneis linearis  (2)
Diploneis littoralis  (5)
Diploneis lulensis 
Diploneis lusatica 
Diploneis maeandra 
Diploneis major  (3)
Diploneis manguinii 
Diploneis marginata  (4)
Diploneis marginestriata  (3)
Diploneis mawsmaii 
Diploneis mesolia 
Diploneis metzeltinii 
Diploneis meyeri 
Diploneis minima 
Diploneis minuta  (2)
Diploneis mirabilis 
Diploneis modica 
Diploneis modicahassiaca 
Diploneis modicella 
Diploneis mongolica 
Diploneis monodi 
Diploneis munge 
Diploneis musciformis 
Diploneis nanofontanella 
Diploneis nanometzeltinii 
Diploneis natalensis 
Diploneis navicans 
Diploneis nitescenes 
Diploneis nitidula 
Diploneis nonelliptica 
Diploneis notata 
Diploneis oamaruensis 
Diploneis oblongella 
Diploneis oblongellopsis 
Diploneis obtusa 
Diploneis ocellata 
Diploneis ocellata 
Diploneis oestrupii 
Diploneis okhapkinii 
Diploneis olandica 
Diploneis ordines 
Diploneis ornamentalis 
Diploneis ornata 
Diploneis ostrobottnica  (3)
Diploneis ovalis 
Diploneis pantocsekii 
Diploneis papula  (1)
Diploneis parabudayana 
Diploneis parahinziae 
Diploneis parallelus 
Diploneis paramarginestriata 
Diploneis parauschkaniensis 
Diploneis parma  (4)
Diploneis patagonica 
Diploneis pearsalli 
Diploneis perforata 
Diploneis peterseni 
Diploneis pinquis 
Diploneis platessa 
Diploneis pneumatica 
Diploneis poretzkyi 
Diploneis poroidea 
Diploneis praerupta 
Diploneis praesejuncta 
Diploneis praetermissa 
Diploneis prisca  (2)
Diploneis proserpinae 
Diploneis pseudaokiensis 
Diploneis pseudobombiformis 
Diploneis pseudomeyeri 
Diploneis pseudopetersenii 
Diploneis pseudovalis  (2)
Diploneis puellafallax 
Diploneis puelloides 
Diploneis pulchella 
Diploneis pulcherrima 
Diploneis pulchra 
Diploneis pullus 
Diploneis pumicosus 
Diploneis pupula 
Diploneis pygmaea 
Diploneis quasispinulosa 
Diploneis rauhialensis 
Diploneis reticulata 
Diploneis rex 
Diploneis rhombica 
Diploneis rhombus 
Diploneis rimosa 
Diploneis robustus 
Diploneis rostrata 
Diploneis rotunda 
Diploneis rouhialensis 
Diploneis rouxioides 
Diploneis rupestris  (2)
Diploneis schmidtii 
Diploneis seperanda 
Diploneis sharbin 
Diploneis skvortzovii 
Diploneis smithi (5)
Diploneis solea 
Diploneis sooi 
Diploneis spectabilis 
Diploneis stagnarum 
Diploneis stauroneiformis 
Diploneis stephen-droopii 
Diploneis stigmosa 
Diploneis stroemi 
Diploneis subadvena 
Diploneis subbaicalensis 
Diploneis submeyeri 
Diploneis suborbicularis  (10)
Diploneis suboricularis 
Diploneis subovalis  (13)
Diploneis subrhombica 
Diploneis subsmithii 
Diploneis sudamericana 
Diploneis suezii 
Diploneis taiga 
Diploneis taschenbergeri 
Diploneis tavcarii 
Diploneis tenuibipunctata 
Diploneis tirolensis 
Diploneis toli 
Diploneis totarae 
Diploneis transylvanica 
Diploneis tugelae 
Diploneis tundra 
Diploneis turgida  (2)
Diploneis uschkaniensis 
Diploneis vandermerwei 
Diploneis vespa 
Diploneis vetusa 
Diploneis vetusta 
Diploneis voigtii 
Diploneis volsella 
Diploneis weissflogiopsis 
Diploneis weretschaginii 
Diploneis wolffii 
Diploneis yamanakaensis 
Diploneis yatukaensis 
Diploneis zannii 
Diploneis zehenterii 

Figures in brackets are approx. how many varieties per species.

References

Naviculales
Diatom genera
Taxa named by Christian Gottfried Ehrenberg